Alexandra Petkovski, also known professionally as her artist project, FJØRA, is a Canadian composer, producer, artist, songwriter and multi-instrumentalist.

Life and career
Petkovski was born in Toronto, Ontario. She received a Bachelor of Music degree from Queen's University, and a Master of Music in Composition from Belmont University, after which she entered the music industry, taking a sabbatical from New York University's Steinhardt School of Music, where she was pursuing postgraduate studies for film scoring.

Petkovski is a voting member at the World Soundtrack Academy, member of the Society of Composers & Lyricists, Alliance for Women Film Composers, Screen Composers Guild of Canada, and was invited to join the Recording Academy's voting member class of 2022. She is an alumnus of the Slaight Family Music Lab at the Canadian Film Centre.

Filmography

As composer
 TBA : Laced (additional score composer - Feature film)
 2022 : This Place (additional vocal scor; feature film)
 2022 : Adidas Women: Support is Everything Campaign (TV series)
 2022 : More Than Robots (additional music; documentary)
 2021 : Better at Texting (short film)
 2021 : Scotiabank Canada #SaidBefore Campaign (TV special)
 2021 : Deathloop : "Déjà Vu" (video game)
 2020 : Welcome to the Blumhouse (feature film)

Discography
 2022 : tiger’s eye (EP) 
 2022 : Sondheim Series
 2021 : Onyx
 2021 : Jade(d)
 2019 : Cruel World

Awards and nominations

References

External links
 
 

21st-century Canadian composers
Canadian film score composers
Canadian Film Centre alumni
Living people
Year of birth missing (living people)